Berta García (born 12 April 1982) is a Spanish rugby sevens player. 
She was in Spain's women's national rugby sevens team at the 2016 Summer Olympics in Brazil. 
She was also in their squad at the 2016 Women's Rugby Sevens Final Olympic Qualification Tournament in Ireland.

García was named in Spain's squad for the 2013 Rugby World Cup Sevens in Russia.
She played for the Spain women's national rugby union team at the 2017 Women's Rugby World Cup.

References

External links 
 

1982 births
Living people
Spain international women's rugby sevens players
Olympic rugby sevens players of Spain
Rugby sevens players at the 2016 Summer Olympics
Sportspeople from Asturias
People from Gozón